The following is a list of central business districts (CBDs).

Africa

Asia

Europe

North America

Oceania

South America

References

Districts